In mathematical analysis, p-variation is a collection of seminorms on functions from an ordered set to a metric space, indexed by a real number . p-variation is a measure of the regularity or smoothness of a function. Specifically, if , where  is a metric space and I a totally ordered set, its p-variation is

where D ranges over all finite partitions of the interval I.

The p variation of a function decreases with p. If f has finite p-variation and g is an α-Hölder continuous function, then  has finite -variation.

The case when p is one is called total variation, and functions with a finite 1-variation are called bounded variation functions.

Link with Hölder norm 

One can interpret the p-variation as a parameter-independent version of the Hölder norm, which also extends to discontinuous functions. 

If f is α–Hölder continuous (i.e. its α–Hölder norm is finite) then its -variation is finite. Specifically, on an interval [a,b], . 

Conversely, if f is continuous and has finite p-variation, there exists a reparameterisation, such that  is Hölder continuous.

If p is less than q then the space of functions of finite p-variation on a compact set is continuously embedded with norm 1 into those of finite q-variation. I.e. 
. However unlike the analogous situation with Hölder spaces the embedding is not compact. 
They are uniformly bounded in 1-variation and converge pointwise to a discontinuous function f but this not only is not a convergence in p-variation for any p but also is not uniform convergence.

Application to Riemann–Stieltjes integration 

If f and g are functions from  [a, b] to ℝ with no common discontinuities and with f having finite p-variation and g having finite q-variation, with  then the Riemann–Stieltjes Integral

is well-defined. The value of this definite integral is bounded by the Young-Loève estimate as follows 

where C is a constant which only depends on p and q and ξ is any number between a and b.
If f and g are continuous, the indefinite integral  is a continuous function with finite q-variation: If a ≤ s ≤ t ≤ b then , its q-variation on [s,t], is bounded by 

where C is a constant which only depends on p and q.

Differential equations driven by signals of finite p-variation, p < 2 
A function from ℝd to e × d real matrices is called an  ℝe-valued one-form on ℝd.

If f is a Lipschitz continuous ℝe-valued one-form on ℝd, and X is a continuous function from the interval [a, b] to ℝd with finite p-variation with p less than 2, then the integral of f on X, can be calculated because each component of f(X(t)) will be a path of finite p-variation and the integral is a sum of finitely many Young integrals. It provides the solution to the equation  driven by the path X.

More significantly, if f is a Lipschitz continuous ℝe-valued one-form on ℝe, and X is a continuous function from the interval [a, b] to ℝd with finite p-variation with p less than 2, then Young integration is enough to establish the solution of the equation  driven by the path X.

Differential equations driven by signals of finite p-variation, p  2 
The theory of rough paths generalises the Young integral and Young differential equations and makes heavy use of the concept of p-variation.

For Brownian motion 

p-variation should be contrasted with the quadratic variation which is used in stochastic analysis, which takes one stochastic process to another. In particular the definition of quadratic variation looks a bit like the definition of p-variation, when p has the value 2. Quadratic variation is defined as a limit as the partition gets finer, whereas p-variation is a supremum over all partitions. Thus the quadratic variation of a process could be smaller than its 2-variation.

Computation of p-variation for discrete time series 

For a discrete time series of observations X0,...,XN it is straightforward to compute its p-variation with complexity of O(N2). Here is an example C++ code using dynamic programming:
double p_var(const std::vector<double>& X, double p) {
	if (X.size() == 0)
		return 0.0;
	std::vector<double> cum_p_var(X.size(), 0.0);   // cumulative p-variation
	for (size_t n = 1; n < X.size(); n++) {
		for (size_t k = 0; k < n; k++) {
			cum_p_var[n] = std::max(cum_p_var[n], cum_p_var[k] + std::pow(std::abs(X[n] - X[k]), p));
		}
	}
	return std::pow(cum_p_var.back(), 1./p);
}
There exist much more efficient, but also more complicated, algorithms for ℝ-valued processes

and for processes in arbitrary metric spaces.

References 

.

External links 
 Continuous Paths with bounded p-variation Fabrice Baudoin
 On the Young integral, truncated variation and rough paths Rafał M. Łochowski

Mathematical analysis